William D. Martin (born c. 1933) is a Canadian former curler. He played third on the 1973 Brier Champion team (skipped by Harvey Mazinke), representing Saskatchewan. They later went on to win second place at the World Championships of that year.

References

External links

 William Martin – Curling Canada Stats Archive
 Video: 

Brier champions
1930s births
Living people
Curlers from Saskatchewan
Canadian male curlers